Infrastrutture Wireless Italiane S.p.A. or, in abbreviated form, INWIT S.p.A., is an Italian company headquartered in Milan, which operates in the wireless network infrastructure sector.

With over eleven thousand towers, INWIT is currently Italy's major Tower Operator providing, as Neutral Host, widespread coverage throughout the country, hosting the transmission equipment for all main national operators. In addition to hosting telco operators on its towers, INWIT is in the process of setting up a Distributed Antenna System (DAS) network that will guarantee excellent coverage in densely populated urban areas like some of Italy's historic centres and other public areas, as well as in large enclosed areas such as stadiums, railway stations, concert areas, historic villages, museums, hotels.

History
INWIT was founded on January 14, 2015, and has been operational since April 1, 2015 following the spin-off of the "Tower" branch of Telecom Italia. From 22 June 2015 INWIT is listed on the Milan Stock Exchange in the FTSE Italia Mid Cap index. During the initial public offering, the company raised €875.3 million, with a capitalization of around €2.2 billion. Currently the company has achieved a market capitalization of over €5.5 billion.

On March 31, 2020, thanks to an agreement with Vodafone, the merger of Vodafone Towers Italia into INWIT was completed.

Operations
In 2018 INWIT confirmed the trend of progressive increase in turnover. Revenue at 31 December 2018 amounted to €378.5 million, up 6.1% compared to the previous year. EBITDA is €215.4 million, up 12.2% compared to the previous year. The 2018 EBIT amounted to 200.3 million euros with an increase of 11.7% compared to the previous year. Net Profit amounts to 140.8 million euros, up 11.1% compared to the 2017 figure.

Competitors
INWIT interacts, in the same market, with Rai Way, EI Towers, which is controlled by Mediaset, and Cellnex (Abertis Group).

See also

 Telecom Italia
 Vodafone

References

External links
 

Telecommunications companies of Italy
Companies based in Milan
Italian brands
Italian companies established in 2015
Telecommunications companies established in 2015
Telecom Italia